Ariel Machado, is a Brazilian kickboxer and mixed martial artist currently signed with Glory, competing in the Light Heavyweight division.

Combat Press ranked him as a top ten light heavyweight kickboxer in the world between November 2021 and June 2022, with Machado peaking at #7.

Kickboxing career
Machado participated in the WGP Kickboxing 26 tournament, facing Junior Alpha in the semifinals. Machado lost the fight by decision. In his next appearance with WGP Kickboxing, he faced Maycon Silva. Machado won the fight by decision.

He took part in the 2016 Glory Light Heavyweight tournament. In the semifinals, he defeated Pavel Zhuravlev by a unanimous decision. He lost the final bout to Zinedine Hameur-Lain by a second round KO.

Machado next fought in the 2016 Glory Middleweight Contender tournament. He lost the very first bout to Yousri Belgaroui by decision.

Machado was scheduled to fight in the 2017 Glory Light Heavyweight Contender tournament. He won a unanimous decision against Danyo Ilunga in the semi finals. In the tournament final, he fought a rematch with Zinedine Hameur-Lain, and won by TKO in the first round.

Briefly fighting outside of Glory, Machado was scheduled to face Lucas Alsina during WGP Kickboxing 38. Machado won the bout in the third round, knocking Alsina out with a flying knee.

He fought for the Glory Light Heavyweight title during Glory 47: Lyon, held at the time by Artem Vakhitov. Vakhitov successfully defended the title, winning by unanimous decision.

His next two fights were outside of Glory, which he won by a split decision against Haime Morais during WGP KB 47, and by KO against Marcelo Nuñez during WGP KB 57.

Machado was scheduled to fight Michael Duut during Glory Collision 2. Machado won by unanimous decision.

Doping suspension

Glory 47
On April 20, 2019, it was announced that Machado failed a drug test prior to Glory 47: Lyon in 2017. He was suspended for 20 months following a positive test for banned substances at the event, where he challenged reigning champion Artem Vakhitov.

Titles and accomplishments
GLORY
2017 Glory Light Heavyweight Contender Tournament Winner

Awards
Combat Press
 2019 Comeback Fighter of the Year

Kickboxing record

|-  style="background:#"
| 2023-03-25||  ||align=left| Valeriy Bizyaev || Ural FC 2 || Samara, Russia ||  ||  || 
|-
! style=background:white colspan=9 |
|-  style="background:#fbb"
| 2023-02-02|| Loss ||align=left| Beybulat Isaev || Muaythai Factory || Kemerovo, Russia || Decision (Unanimous) || 3 ||3:00  
|-  bgcolor="#cfc"
| 2022-11-04 || Win||align=left| Lucas Monteiro || WGP Kickboxing #67 || Curitiba, Brazil || TKO (Low kicks) || 2 ||
|-  bgcolor="#fbb"
| 2022-07-15|| Loss||align=left| Nikita Kozlov || RCC Fair Fight 18 || Yekaterinburg, Russia || Decision (Unanimous) || 3 || 3:00
|-  bgcolor="#cfc"
| 2019-12-21|| Win||align=left| Michael Duut || Glory Collision 2 || Arnhem, Netherlands || Decision (Unanimous) || 3 || 3:00
|-  bgcolor="#cfc"
| 2019-09-13|| Win||align=left| Marcelo Nuñez || WGP Kickboxing #57 || Curitiba, Brazil || KO (Right Hook) || 1 || 1:18
|-  bgcolor="#cfc"
| 2018-07-27|| Win||align=left| Haime Morais || WGP Kickboxing #47 || Curitiba, Brazil || Decision (Split)|| 3 || 3:00
|-  style="background:#FFBBBB;"
| 2017-10-28 || Loss||align=left| Artem Vakhitov || Glory 47: Lyon || Lyon, France || Decision (unanimous) || 5 || 3:00 
|-
! style=background:white colspan=9 |
|-  bgcolor="#cfc" 
| 2017-07-01 || Win||align=left| Lucas Alsina || WGP Kickboxing #38 || Curitiba, Brazil|| KO (Flying Knee)|| 3 ||  2:42
|-  bgcolor="#cfc" 
| 2017-02-24 || Win||align=left| Zinedine Hameur-Lain || Glory 38: Chicago, Final || Hoffman Estates, Illinois, USA || TKO (Punches) || 1 || 2:43
|-  bgcolor="#cfc"
| 2017-02-24 || Win||align=left| Danyo Ilunga || Glory 38: Chicago, Semi Finals || Hoffman Estates, Illinois, USA || Decision (unanimous) || 3 || 3:00
|-  bgcolor="#FFBBBB"
| 2016-10-21 || Loss||align=left| Yousri Belgaroui || Glory 34: Denver - Middleweight Contender Tournament, Semi Finals || Broomfield, Colorado, USA || Decision (unanimous) || 3 || 3:00
|-  style="background:#FFBBBB;"
| 2016-07-22 || Loss||align=left| Zinedine Hameur-Lain|| Glory 32: Virginia, Final || Norfolk, Virginia || KO (strikes) || 2 || 1:00
|-  bgcolor="#cfc" 
| 2016-07-22 || Win||align=left| Pavel Zhuravlev || Glory 32: Virginia, Semi Finals || Norfolk, Virginia, USA || Decision (unanimous) || 3 ||  3:00
|-  bgcolor="#cfc" 
| 2016-04-09 || Win||align=left| Maycon Silva || WGP Kickboxing #29 || Brazil|| Decision  || 3 ||  3:00
|-  bgcolor="#FFBBBB" 
| 2015-09-05 || Loss||align=left| Junior Alpha || WGP Kickboxing #26, Semi Final || Guarapuava, Brazil|| Decision  || 3 ||  3:00
|-  bgcolor="#FFBBBB" 
| 2009 || Loss||align=left| Alessandro Geloco || Brave FC || Curitiba, Brazil|| KO (Right Hook)|| 1 ||
|-  bgcolor="" 
| 2009|| ||align=left| José Carlos "Zinho" Oliveira ||  || Brazil|| Decision || 3|| 3:00
|-  bgcolor="#cfc" 
| 2007|| Win||align=left| Fábio Pelézinho ||  || Brazil|| KO (Right Cross) || 2 ||  
|-
| colspan=9 | Legend:    

|-  bgcolor="#fbb"
| 2021-10- || Loss||align=left| Bahram Rajabzadeh || W.A.K.O World Championships 2021, K-1 1/8 Final +91 kg  || Jesolo, Italy || Decision (3:0) || 3 || 2:00
|-
| colspan=9 | Legend:

Mixed martial arts record

|-
|Win
|align=center|7-3
|Mauri Roque
|TKO (Corner Stoppage)
|Power Fight Extreme 12
|
|align=center|2
|align=center|5:00
|Curitiba, Brazil
|
|-
|Loss
|align=center|6-3
|Julio Cesar Araujo Fernandes
|Submission (Rear naked choke)
|Talent MMA Circuit 11 - Sao Jose dos Pinhais 2014
|
|align=center|1
|align=center|1:58
|Pinhais, Brazil
|-
|Win
|align=center|6-2
|Dyego Roberto
|TKO (Punches and Knees)
|Power Fight Extreme 11
|
|align=center|2
|align=center|0:43
|Curitiba, Brazil
|-
|Loss
|align=center|5-2
|Gerson da Silva Conceicao
|Submission (Punches)
|Watch Out Combat Show 29
|
|align=center|2
|align=center|1:03
|Rio de Janeiro, Brazil
|-
|Win
|align=center|5-1
|Rodrigo Jesus	
|TKO (Punches)
|Power Fight Extreme 9
|
|align=center|2
|align=center|0:45
|Curitiba, Brazil
|-
|Win
|align=center|4-1
|Bruno Assuncao Bogado
|TKO (Head Kick)
|Adventure Fighters Tournament 4
|
|align=center|1
|align=center|0:33
|Curitiba, Brazil
|-
|Win
|align=center|3-1
|Tiago Batista Costa
|TKO
|Beltrao Combat 2
|
|align=center|2
|align=center|
|Brazil
|-
|Win
|align=center|2-1
|Wanderley da Hora
|TKO (Punches)
|Duelo de Titas
|
|align=center|1
|align=center|2:40
|Brazil
|-
|Win
|align=center|1-1
|Tiago Monaco Tosato
|TKO (Punches)
|Adventure Fighters Tournament
|
|align=center|1
|align=center|2:37
|Curitiba, Brazil
|-
|Loss
|align=center|0-1
|Paulo Bueno	
|Submission (Punches)
|Toycas Toyota Cup 2006
|
|align=center|1
|align=center|1:20
|Curitiba, Brazil

See also
List of male kickboxers

External links
 Official Glory profile

References

1987 births
Living people
Brazilian male kickboxers
Glory kickboxers
Sportspeople from Curitiba
Light heavyweight kickboxers
Doping cases in kickboxing
Brazilian male mixed martial artists